Minuscule 736 (in the Gregory-Aland numbering), Θε320 (von Soden), is a Greek minuscule manuscript of the New Testament written on parchment. Palaeographically it has been assigned to the 12th century. The manuscript has no complex contents. Scrivener labelled it as 754e.

Description 

The codex contains the text of the Gospel of Matthew and Gospel of John, on 235 parchment leaves (size ), with some lacunae (Matthew 1:1-16; 2:3-9; 6:3-9:30; John 19:24-34, 20:19-29). The text is written in one column per page, 35 lines per page.

There is no another division according to the smaller Ammonian Sections (with references to the Eusebian Canons).

It contains lists of the  before each Gospel.

Text 

The Greek text of the codex is a representative of the Byzantine text-type. Aland placed it in Category V.

It was not examined by the Claremont Profile Method.

It lacks the Pericope Adulterae (John 7:53-8:11).

History 

Scrivener dated the manuscript to the 11th or 12th century, Gregory dated the manuscript to the 12th century. The manuscript is currently dated by the INTF to the 12th century.

The manuscript was added to the list of New Testament manuscripts by Scrivener (754) and Gregory (736). It was examined and described by Paulin Martin. Gregory saw the manuscript in 1885.

The manuscript is now housed at the Bibliothèque nationale de France (Gr. 198) in Paris.

See also 

 List of New Testament minuscules
 Biblical manuscript
 Textual criticism

References

Further reading 

 

Greek New Testament minuscules
12th-century biblical manuscripts
Bibliothèque nationale de France collections